Mohammadreza Mehdizadeh (born February 19, 1994) is an Iranian football defender who currently played for Sepahan club.

Club career statistics

References

1994 births
Living people
Iranian footballers
Tractor S.C. players
Association football defenders
People from Rasht
Sportspeople from Gilan province